Janez Lampič (born 27 September 1996) also often known as Janez Lampic (to avoid confusion with his father's name) is a Slovenian male cross-country skier. He went onto participate at the 2018 Winter Olympics representing Slovenia and competed in the men's sprint event finished on 46th position.

Biography 
Janez Lampic was born on 27 September 1996 just after his elder sister's birth in 1995. His father, Janez Lampič was a professional road cyclist who represented Yugoslavia at the 1984 Summer Olympics and competed in the men's team time trial event. His elder sister, Anamarija Lampič is also a cross-country skier who has competed at the World Championships held in 2015 and 2017 before earning an opportunity to compete for Slovenia at the 2018 Winter Olympics. Coincidentally, both Janez Lampič and Anamarija Lampič made their Olympic debuts during the 2018 Winter Olympics and competed in the cross-country skiing events.

Cross-country skiing results
All results are sourced from the International Ski Federation (FIS).

Olympic Games

World Championships

World Cup

Season standings

References 

1996 births
Living people
Slovenian male cross-country skiers
Cross-country skiers at the 2018 Winter Olympics
Cross-country skiers at the 2022 Winter Olympics
Olympic cross-country skiers of Slovenia
Skiers from Ljubljana